Hajji Yusef may refer to:
 Hajji Yusef-e Olya, East Azerbaijan Province
 Hajji Yusef-e Sofla, East Azerbaijan Province